The Ulset Hydroelectric Power Station ( or Ulset kraftstasjon) is a hydroelectric power station in the municipality of Tynset in Hedmark county, Norway.

It also utilizes water from two streams, which reduces the volume of water supplied to the Ya River.

The plant has a 35 MW Francis turbine and an average annual production of about 140 GWh. It started production in 1985. The plant is owned by KVO, whereby Statkraft is the largest owner and it is operated by Trondheim Energi Kraft.

References

Hydroelectric power stations in Norway
Tynset
Statkraft
Energy infrastructure completed in 1985